Julien Knafo is a Canadian composer and film director from Quebec. He is most noted for the 2009 film Blind Spot (Lucidité passagère), for which he was a Jutra Award nominee for Best Original Music at the 13th Jutra Awards in 2011; he was also one of the collective film's four directors, alongside Fabrice Barrilliet, Nicolas Bolduc and Marie-Hélène Panisset.

His other credits as a composer have included The Marsh (Le Marais) and Marguerite. His solo feature debut as a director, Brain Freeze, was released in 2021.

References

External links

21st-century Canadian screenwriters
21st-century Canadian male writers
21st-century Canadian composers
Canadian film score composers
Canadian male screenwriters
Film directors from Quebec
Musicians from Quebec
Writers from Quebec
Concordia University alumni
Living people
Year of birth missing (living people)